Fabiano Bolla Lora (born 19 September 1977 in São Paulo), known as Fabiano Paredão or just Fabiano, is a Brazilian former footballer who played as a goalkeeper.

Fabiano Paredão, considered an idol by América Futebol Clube (RN) supporters, finished his career playing in the Rio Grande do Norte state championship with Alecrim Futebol Clube at age 37.

Honours 
 Torneio Rio – São Paulo in 1997 with Santos.
 Copa CONMEBOL in 1998 with Santos.
 Campeonato Paulista Série A2 in 2004 with Inter de Limeira.
 Copa RN in 2006 and 2012 with América-RN.
 Campeonato Cearense in 2010 with Fortaleza.
 Campeonato Potiguar in 2012 with América-RN.
 Campeonato Paraense in 2014 and 2015 with Remo.

References

External links 
 Sambafoot.com Profile

1977 births
Living people
Brazilian footballers
Brazilian people of Spanish descent
América Futebol Clube (RN) players
Clube do Remo players
Association football goalkeepers
Footballers from São Paulo